Tallinn International Horse Show is an international equestrian sports competition which annually takes place in Saku Suurhall, Tallinn, Estonia. The first competition took place on 18–20 October 2002.

Winners

The winners of Horse Show Grand Prix and FEI World Cup:
 2002 Rein Pill and Ecuador (EST)
 2003 Matthias Granzow and Cabrol Amicor (GER)
 2004 Camilla Enemark and Diamant du Gaty (DEN)

References

External links
 

Equestrian sports competitions
Equestrian sports in Estonia